Ponerorchis parceflora is a species of flowering plant in the family Orchidaceae, native to south-central China (north-east Sichuan, Chongqing). The epithet has been mis-spelt "parciflora" by some authors.

Taxonomy
The species was first described in 1902 by Achille Eugène Finet, as Peristylus tetralobus f. parceflorus. It was later raised to a full species and transferred to the genus Amitostigma as Amitostigma parceflorum. A molecular phylogenetic study in 2014 found that species of Amitostigma, Neottianthe and Ponerorchis were mixed together in a single clade, making none of the three genera monophyletic as then circumscribed. Amitostigma and Neottianthe were subsumed into Ponerorchis, with this species becoming Ponerorchis parceflora.

References

parceflora
Flora of South-Central China
Plants described in 1902